The Groot River (English: "Large River") is a river in the Western Cape Province, South Africa. It is part of the Olifants/Doring River system. It is not to be confused with the Groot River of Eastern Cape or the Groot River of Southern Cape provinces.

Course
It is formed by the confluence of the Twee River and Lang River, flowing off the eastern slopes of the Cederberg Mountains, south-east of Citrusdal.

The river flows in an easterly direction through the Skurweberge Mountains where it joins the Riet River that rises as the Winkelhaak River and Houdenbeks River north of Ceres. Below this confluence, the Riet River is joined by the Brandkraals River and Matjies River, after which it flows into the Doring River.

Ecology
The Clanwilliam Yellowfish (Labeobarbus capensis), a local endemic classified as Vulnerable by the IUCN, is still found in this river.

See also 
 List of rivers of South Africa

References

External links
The Influence of Hydraulics, Hydrology and Temperature on the Distribution, Habitat, Use and Recruitment of Threatened Cyprinids in a Western Cape River, South Africa
Doring River: Tributaries

Rivers of the Western Cape